Hambrook is a village in South Gloucestershire, England, situated on the north-eastern outskirts of the city of Bristol. It lies between the larger communities of Winterbourne and Frenchay and is part of the Civil Parish of Winterbourne.

A small settlement was recorded at Hambrook in the Domesday Book.

Today, Hambrook is a commuter village, with the M4 and the Avon Ring Road bisecting it.

Hambrook lies at the south-western foot of Winterbourne Hill. The River Frome and its walkway pass along the village's eastern edge and the Bradley Brook converges with the former in Hambrook. The village is flanked by woodland and fields. Hambrook has a common (or village green) which locals refer to as either 'Hambrook' or 'Whiteshill Common' because of its proximity to the hamlet of Whiteshill. The Common is home to the Civil Parish of Winterbourne's war memorial and the village's primary school, with cottages on either side and is sometimes used for cricket matches.

Hambrook Court is an 18th-century house. It has been designated as a Grade II listed building.

References

Civil Parish of Winterbourne
Villages in South Gloucestershire District